Haguenau is a commune in today's France.

Hagenau or Haguenau may also refer to:
 Gottfried von Hagenau, an Alsatian poet, theologian and medical doctor
 Reinmar of Hagenau (and Reinmar von Hagenau), an Alsatian songwriter
 Forest of Hagenau, France